Viktor Anatolyevich Shenderovich (born August 15, 1958) is a Russian satirist, writer, scriptwriter and radio host.

Biography
Shenderovich was born in Moscow into a family of Belarusian Jewish origin. In 1980, he graduated from the Moscow State Art and Cultural University, specializing in "direction of volunteer theatrical groups". He is best known as a scriptwriter of popular political puppet show Puppets, which was aired on NTV 1994 to 2002. He hosted satirical author program Total on NTV 1997 to 2001 and TV-6 in 2002. Later, Shenderovich ran a weekly program Processed Cheese on the Echo of Moscow radio station. The texts of this program's editions were later collected in his book Better Two Heads Than One, implying Russian President Dmitry Medvedev and Prime Minister Vladimir Putin. Nowadays Shenderovich is a columnist of The New Times, a liberal Russian weekly.

He is known as an outspoken critic of Vladimir Putin's rule and the government's stance on the war in Chechnya. Shenderovich is among the 10 first signatories of the online anti-Putin manifesto "Putin Must Go" published in March 2010. On 26 December 2010, Shenderovich played a major role in organizing a "Moscow for Everyone" rally in the capital of Russia, in response to race riots having occurred earlier in the month.

On 30 December 2021, Russia's Ministry of Justice added Shenderovich to its list of “foreign agents”.

On January 11, 2022, Shenderovich left Russia because of a pressure campaign against him by officials, including his controversial designation as a "foreign agent." He was living in Poland as of January 13, 2022.

Candidate
In 2005, Shenderovich ran for a seat in a December 4 by-election to the State Duma but came in second to the popular filmmaker Stanislav Govorukhin. The winner took 38% of votes and Shenderovich took 17%. Before the election, Shenderovich protested the "widely illegal and immoral practices" of Govorukhin in court, but his appeal was rejected by the judge as unfounded.

In 2006, he published the book Nedodumets in which he summarized his experience as a Duma candidate.

References

External links

His Official Site 
His blog 
His publications in on-line journal Ezhednevnyi Zhurnal (The Daily Journal) 
Liberal Duma Candidate Says Pressured By Kremlin Officials

1958 births
Living people
Writers from Moscow
Russian journalists
Russian political activists
Russian television personalities
Echo of Moscow radio presenters
Russian dissidents
Russian liberals
Russian Jews
Russian people of Belarusian-Jewish descent
Israeli people of Belarusian-Jewish descent
People listed in Russia as media foreign agents
Russian activists against the 2022 Russian invasion of Ukraine
Mass media people from Moscow